is a Japanese manga series written and illustrated by Daisuke Igarashi. It was serialized in Shogakukan's Monthly Ikki from April 2003 to November 2004, with its chapters collected in two tankōbon volumes. The series is licensed for English release in North America by Seven Seas Entertainment. Witches received an Excellence Award at the eighth Japan Media Arts Festival in 2004.

Publication
It was serialized in Shogakukan's seinen manga magazine Monthly Ikki from April 25, 2003, to November 25, 2004. Shogakukan collected its chapters in two tankōbon volumes, released on April 30, 2004, and January 28, 2005.

In North America, Seven Seas Entertainment licensed the manga for English publication in a single omnibus volume, for both digital and print format, and was released on May 3, 2022. The manga was licensed in France by Casterman, in Italy by Kappa Edizioni and in Spain by Planeta DeAgostini.

Volume list

Reception
Witches received an Excellence Award at the eighth Japan Media Arts Festival in 2004. In 2023, it was ranked in the American Library Association's Graphic Novels and Comics Round Table's "Best Graphic Novels for Adults" list, under its "Fiction" category.

References

Further reading

External links

Seinen manga
Seven Seas Entertainment titles
Shogakukan manga
Supernatural anime and manga
Witchcraft in anime and manga
Witchcraft in written fiction